Amorosa is a 1986 Swedish film starring Stina Ekblad and Erland Josephson and directed by Mai Zetterling. The story, an adaptation of the life of writer Agnes von Krusenstjerna (Ekblad), details her sexually charged and often turbulent relationship with David Sprengel (Josephson). At the 22nd Guldbagge Awards, Ekblad won the award for Best Actress and Josephson won the award for Best Actor.

Cast
Stina Ekblad as Agnes von Krusenstjerna
Erland Josephson as David Sprengel
Philip Zandén as Adolf von Krusenstjerna
Lena T. Hansson as Ava
Olof Thunberg as Ernst von Krusenstjerna
Peter Schildt as Gerhard Odencrantz
Rico Rönnbäck as Edward von Krusenstjerna
Inga Landgré as sister Klara
Inga Gill as Mrs. Tollen
Anita Björk as Arvida Gottliebsen
Lauritz Falk as Hugo Hamilton
Gunnel Broström as Evelina Hamilton
Johan Rabaeus as Jan Guy Hamilton
Mimi Pollak as friherrinnan Rosenhjelm
Börje Ahlstedt as Joachim Rosenhjelm
Gösta Krantz as Felix Tollen
Margreth Weivers as Beda Odencrantz
Henrik Schildt as Frey Odencrantz
Nils Eklund as Salomon Gottliebsen

Production
The film was shot primarily in Sweden and Venice, Italy.

References

External links

1986 films
1980s Swedish-language films
Films directed by Mai Zetterling
1986 drama films
Swedish drama films
1980s Swedish films